Carlos Antônio Dobbert de Carvalho Leite (June 25, 1912 – July 19, 2004), best known as Carvalho Leite was a Brazilian Association footballer who played as a striker. 

Leite was born in Rio de Janeiro. In a career that spanned 15 years between 1927 and 1943, Leite played for Petropolitano and Botafogo, winning five Campeonato Carioca titles (1930, 1932, 1933, 1934, 1935) with Botafogo. He was top goalscorer in 1931, 1935, 1936, 1938 and 1939. 

Leite was a member of the Brazilian 1930 World Cup squad, being the youngest player of the tournament (a record he held until Pelé debuted at 17 in the 1958 World Cup). He was also a part of the 1934 World Cup squad. He died in July 2004 at the age of 92, by which time he was the last surviving player of the Brazilian 1930 World Cup team.

Honours

Club
 Campeonato Carioca (5): 
Botafogo: 1930, 1932, 1933, 1934, 1935

Individual
 Campeonato Carioca topscorer (5): 
Botafogo: 1931 (13 goal), 1935 (16 goal), 1936 (15 goal), 1938 (16 goal), 1939 (22 goal)

References

External links

1912 births
1930 FIFA World Cup players
2004 deaths
Footballers from Rio de Janeiro (city)
Brazilian footballers
Brazil international footballers
Association football forwards
Botafogo de Futebol e Regatas players
1934 FIFA World Cup players
Brazilian football managers
Botafogo de Futebol e Regatas managers